Joseph Bloomfield (October 18, 1753October 3, 1823) was the fourth governor of New Jersey. He also served two terms in the United States House of Representatives from 1817 to 1821.

The township of Bloomfield, New Jersey is named for him.

Birth
Joseph Bloomfield was born in Woodbridge in the Province of New Jersey to Moses Bloomfield, a physician, and Sarah Ogden on October 18, 1753. Moses Bloomfield was a surgeon and an abolitionist.

Education and military service
Joseph was educated at Reverend Enoch Green’s school in Deerfield Township, New Jersey, where Green was the pastor of the local Presbyterian Church. Bloomfield studied law, was admitted to the bar in 1775 and began his law practice in Bridgeton, New Jersey. He entered the Continental Army as captain of the 3rd New Jersey Regiment on February 9, 1776. He attained the rank of major on November 28, 1776, and was appointed judge advocate of the northern army. He was wounded at the Battle of Brandywine in September 1777. He resigned from the Continental Army on October 28, 1778, after he was elected clerk of the New Jersey General Assembly.

In 1794, Bloomfield led Federal and New Jersey state troops to put down the Whiskey Rebellion, a popular uprising conducted by Appalachian settlers who resisted the excise tax on liquor and distilled drinks, near Pittsburgh, Pennsylvania. From 1795 to 1800 he served as Mayor of Burlington, New Jersey.

At the start of the War of 1812 Bloomfield was commissioned as a brigadier general in the United States Army on March 13, 1812. He served until June 15, 1815 along the Canada–US border.

Marriages
Joseph married Mary McIlvaine (1752–1818), the daughter of William McIlvaine (1722–1770), a physician from Burlington, New Jersey. Her brother, Col. Joseph McIlvaine (1749–1787), was the father of Joseph McIlvaine (1769–1826), United States Senator from New Jersey. They had no children.

After the death of his first wife, he married Isabella Ramsey (1779–1871), the daughter of John Ramsey.

Public life
At the close of the Revolutionary War, Bloomfield became one of the founding members of The Society of the Cincinnati in the state of New Jersey, and served as the State Society's President from 1808 until his death in 1823.

He practiced law in Burlington, New Jersey and was the registrar of the admiralty court from 1779 to 1783. He served as the New Jersey Attorney General from 1783 to 1792 and as a trustee of Princeton College from 1793 until his death. He was elected Governor of New Jersey as a Democratic-Republican and served in office from 1801–1802 and from 1803–1812.

In 1814, Bloomfield was elected a member of the American Antiquarian Society.

Congress
Bloomfield was elected as a Democratic-Republican to the Fifteenth United States Congress and reelected to the Sixteenth Congress from March 4, 1817 through March 3, 1821, where he represented New Jersey's At-large congressional district.  Bloomfield ran for, but was not elected to, the Seventeenth Congress.

Legacy and death
In 1796, what had been known as the Old First Church was formed and was named the Presbyterian Society of Bloomfield in honor of Joseph Bloomfield. When the Township of Bloomfield was formed, the name was taken from the name of the church.

Bloomfield died in Burlington, New Jersey on October 3, 1823, and was buried in Saint Mary's Episcopal Churchyard in Burlington.

References

Further reading

 (on Bloomfield, Joseph, 1753–1823)

External links

Biography of Joseph Bloomfield, New Jersey State Library
New Jersey Governor Joseph Bloomfield, National Governors Association

 The Society of the Cincinnati
 The American Revolution Institute

1753 births
1823 deaths
Continental Army officers from New Jersey
Governors of New Jersey
New Jersey Attorneys General
New Jersey lawyers
People from Burlington, New Jersey
People from Woodbridge Township, New Jersey
United States Army generals
American Presbyterians
Mayors of Burlington, New Jersey
Democratic-Republican Party members of the United States House of Representatives from New Jersey
Democratic-Republican Party state governors of the United States
Members of the American Antiquarian Society
Burials in New Jersey
19th-century American lawyers
18th-century American politicians
19th-century American politicians